Rizvan Teymurov (16 April 1967, Ashaghy Gushchular, Shusha, Azerbaijan SSR, USSR – 9 December 1991, Karkijahan, Khankendi, Azerbaijan) was a National Hero of Azerbaijan and the warrior of the First Nagorno-Karabakh War.

Life 
He was born on April 16, 1967, in Ashaghy Gushchular, Shusha district of Azerbaijan SSR. In 1984, he graduated from the high school in the village of Gushchular. In 1985, he was called up for military service, completed his service in Omsk and returned to his homeland. Rizvan later worked in Arkhangelsk region in 1987. In 1990, he returned to Azerbaijan and started serving in the regiment of the Ministry of Internal Affairs of Azerbaijan established in Shusha.

Karabakh war 
He fought against Armenian separatists in the villages of Garadağlı, Sırkhavand, Umudlu, Meshali, Jamilli. On December 9, 1991, he was killed during a clash in the village of Karkijahan.

Memorial 
By the decree of the President of the Republic of Azerbaijan dated October 8, 1992, Rizvan Rehman oglu Teymurov was awarded the title of National Hero of Azerbaijan (posthumously). One of the streets in Baku's Nizami district and also Guschular village high school are named after him.  His bust was made in 2020.

Awards 
  (08.10.1992) — Gold Star Medal (Azerbaijan) (posthumously)

See also 
 List of National Heroes of Azerbaijan

References

Sources 
 

1967 births
1991 deaths
Azerbaijani military personnel
Azerbaijani military personnel of the Nagorno-Karabakh War
Azerbaijani military personnel killed in action
National Heroes of Azerbaijan
Military personnel from Shusha